Karundia is a large village in the Chand block of Kaimur of Bihar in India. It belongs to the Patna Division. It is located 30 km towards west from the district headquarters of Bhabua and is located at a distance of 172 km from the state capital Patna.

Karundia is famous for annual kali Pooja &Tazia (fair) mela.

History
Karundia was a part of the Rohitash district before 1991. Karundia is a border of kaimur district of Bihar and Uttar chandauli district of uttar Pradesh.
This village  belongs to the kargil martyred Saheed kamaludin. Famous teacher late Yamuna lal and
Mr. N.L. Shrivastva who installed a famous Shivlinga (statue) in karaundia.

Economy
70% population are based on an agricultural income, 10% of the population are based on small scale business, and 20% are professionals.

Related pages
Kaimur

References

Bhabua, kaimur, varanasi

Villages in Kaimur district